

Results

See also

 Sport in Japan
 Football in Japan
 Women's football in Japan
 Japan Football Association
 Japan national football team

References

External links
 Japan Football Association (JFA) 

 U-16 International Dream Cup 2015
 U-16 International Dream Cup 2016
 U-16 International Dream Cup 2017
 U-16 International Dream Cup 2018
 U-16 International Dream Cup 2019
 U-16 International Dream Cup 2022

 U-16 International Dream Cup 2015
 U-16 International Dream Cup 2016
 U-16 International Dream Cup 2017
 U-16 International Dream Cup 2018
 U-16 International Dream Cup 2019
 U-16 International Dream Cup 2022

Youth association football competitions for international teams
International association football competitions hosted by Japan
Football cup competitions in Japan
Youth football in Japan